Owasso Public Schools is a school district that serves Owasso, Oklahoma. The district consists of 15 academic campuses, including Owasso High School. , the district has 9,225 students enrolled The superintendent of the district is Dr. Margaret Coates. The district is known for its involvement in Owasso Independent School District v. Falvo, a case that reached the US Supreme Court.

Schools 
Owasso Public Schools has 15 different educational campuses, all located in Owasso, Oklahoma. There are 9 elementary school campuses, 3 middle schools, and 3 high school campuses. Among the high school campuses is the Ram Academy, a program aimed at preventing students from dropping out of high school. The program was recognized in 2015 by the National Dropout Prevention Network for its work in helping at-risk youth.

Elementary schools 

 Ator Elementary
 Bailey Elementary
 Barnes Elementary
 Hodson Elementary
 Mills Elementary
 Morrow Elementary
 Northeast Elementary
 Smith Elementary
 Stone Canyon Elementary

Middle schools 

 Sixth Grade Center
 Seventh Grade Center
 Eighth Grade Center

High schools 

 Owasso High School
 Ram Academy

Owasso Independent School District v. Falvo 

In 2002, a parent sued the school district alleging that peer grading is a violation of the Family Educational Rights and Privacy Act of 1974 (FERPA). FERPA stipulates that federal funds can be withheld from schools that disclose educational records without parental consent. The case made its way to the Supreme Court of the United States, which unanimously agreed that peer grading is not a violation of FERPA.

References

External links 

 

School districts in Oklahoma